In aviation, the instrument landing system (ILS) is a precision radio navigation system that provides short-range guidance to aircraft to allow them to approach a runway at night or in bad weather. At that point the runway should be visible to the pilot; if it is not, they perform a missed approach. Bringing the aircraft this close to the runway dramatically increases the range of weather conditions in which a safe landing can be made. Other versions of the system, or "categories", have further reduced the minimum altitudes, runway visual ranges (RVRs), and transmitter and monitoring configurations designed depending on the normal expected weather patterns and airport safety requirements.

ILS uses two directional radio signals, the localizer (108 to 112 MHz frequency), which provides horizontal guidance, and the glideslope (329.15 to 335 MHz frequency) for vertical guidance. The relationship between the aircraft's position and these signals is displayed on an aircraft instrument, often additional pointers in the attitude indicator. The pilot attempts to manoeuvre the aircraft to keep the indicators centered while they approach the runway to the decision height. Optional marker beacon(s) provide distance information as the approach proceeds, including the middle marker (MM), placed close to the position of the (CAT 1) decision height. Markers are largely being phased out and replaced by distance measuring equipment (DME).  The ILS usually includes high-intensity lighting at the end of the runways to help the pilot locate the runway and transition from the approach to a visual landing.

A number of radio-based landing systems were developed between the 1920s and 1940s, notably the Lorenz beam which saw relatively wide use in Europe prior to World War II. The US-developed SCS-51 system was more accurate while also adding vertical guidance. Many sets were installed at airbases in the United Kingdom during World War II, which led to it being selected as the international standard after the formation of the International Civil Aviation Organization (ICAO) in 1947. Several competing landing systems have been developed, including the radar-based ground-controlled approach (GCA) and the more recent microwave landing system (MLS), but few of these systems have been deployed. ILS remains a widespread standard to this day.

The introduction of precision approaches using global navigation satellite systems (GNSSs) instead of requiring expensive airport infrastructure is leading to the replacement of ILS. Providing the required accuracy with GNSS normally requires only a low-power omnidirectional augmentation signal to be broadcast from the airport, which is dramatically less expensive than the multiple, large and powerful transmitters required for a full ILS implementation. By 2015, the number of US airports supporting ILS-like LPV approaches exceeded the number of ILS installations, and this is expected to lead to the eventual removal of ILS at most airports.

Principle of operation 

An instrument landing system operates as a ground-based instrument approach system that provides precision lateral and vertical guidance to an aircraft approaching and landing on a runway, using a combination of radio signals and, in many cases, high-intensity lighting arrays to enable a safe landing during instrument meteorological conditions (IMC), such as low ceilings or reduced visibility due to fog, rain, or blowing snow.

Beam systems

Previous blind landing radio aids typically took the form of beam systems of various types. These normally consisted of a radio transmitter that was connected to a motorized switch to produce a pattern of Morse code dots and dashes. The switch also controlled which of two directional antennae the signal was sent to. The resulting signal sent into the air consists of dots sent to one side of the runway and dashes to the other. The beams were wide enough so they overlapped in the center.

To use the system an aircraft only needed a conventional radio receiver. As they approached the airport they would tune in the signal and listen to it in their headphones. They would hear dots and dashes (Morse code "A" or "N"), if they were to the side of the runway, or if they were properly aligned, the two mixed together to produce a steady tone, the equisignal. The accuracy of this measurement was highly dependent on the skill of the operator, listening to the signal on earphones in a noisy aircraft often whilst communicating with the tower at the same time.

Accuracy of the system was normally on the order of 3 degrees in azimuth. While this was useful for bringing the aircraft onto the direction of the runway, it was not accurate enough to safely bring the aircraft to visual range in bad weather; the radio course beams were used only for lateral guidance, and the system was not enough on its own to perform landings in heavy rain or fog. Nevertheless, the final decision to land was made at only  from the airport.

ILS concept
The ILS, developed just prior to the start of World War II, used a more complex system of signals and an antenna array to achieve higher accuracy. This requires significantly more complexity in the ground station and transmitters, with the advantage that the signals can be accurately decoded in the aircraft using simple electronics and displayed directly on analog instruments. The instruments can be placed in front of the pilot, eliminating the need for a radio operator to continually monitor the signals and relay the results to the pilot over the intercom.

Key to its operation is a concept known as the amplitude modulation index, a measure of how strongly the amplitude modulation is applied to the carrier frequency. In the earlier beam systems, the signal was turned on and off entirely, corresponding to a modulation index of 100%. The determination of angle within the beam is based on the comparison of the audible strength of the two signals.

In ILS, a more complex system of signals and antennas varies the modulation of two signals across the entire width of the beam pattern. The system relies on the use of sidebands, secondary frequencies that are created when two different signals are mixed. For instance, if one takes a radio frequency signal at 10 MHz and mixes that with an audible tone at 2500 Hz, four signals will be produced, at the original signals’ frequencies of 2500 and 10000000 hertz, and sidebands 9997500 and 10002500 hertz. The original 2500 Hz signal's frequency is too low to travel far from an antenna, but the other three signals are all radio frequency and can be effectively transmitted.

ILS starts by mixing two modulating signals to the carrier, one at 90 Hz and another at 150. This creates a signal with five radio frequencies in total, the carrier and four sidebands. This combined signal, known as the CSB for "carrier and sidebands", is sent out evenly from an antenna array. The CSB is also sent into a circuit that suppresses the original carrier, leaving only the four sideband signals. This signal, known as SBO for "sidebands only", is also sent to the antenna array.

For lateral guidance, known as the localizer, the antenna is normally placed centrally at the far end of the runway and consists of multiple antennas in an array normally about the same width of the runway. Each individual antenna has a particular phase shift and power level applied only to the SBO signal such that the resulting signal is retarded 90 degrees on the left side of the runway and advanced 90 degrees on the right. Additionally, the 150 Hz signal is inverted on one side of the pattern, another 180 degree shift. Due to the way the signals mix in space the SBO signals destructively interfere with and almost eliminate each other along the centerline, leaving just the CSB signal predominating. At any other location, on either side of the centerline, the SBO and CSB signals combine in different ways so that one modulating signal predominates.

A receiver in front of the array will receive both of these signals mixed together. Using simple electronic filters, the original carrier and two sidebands can be separated and demodulated to extract the original amplitude-modulated 90 and 150 Hz signals. These are then averaged to produce two direct current (DC) signals. Each of these signals represents not the strength of the original signal, but the strength of the modulation relative to the carrier, which varies across the beam pattern. This has the great advantage that the measurement of angle is independent of range.

The two DC signals are then sent to a conventional voltmeter, with the 90 Hz output pulling the needle right and the other left. Along the centreline the two modulating tones of the sidebands will be cancelled out and both voltages will be zero, leaving the needle centered in the display. If the aircraft is far to the left, the 90 Hz signal will produce a strong DC voltage (predominates), and the 150 Hz signal is minimised, pulling the needle all the way to the right. This means the voltmeter directly displays both the direction and magnitude of the turn needed to bring the aircraft back to the runway centreline. As the measurement compares different parts of a single signal entirely in electronics, it provides angular resolution of less than a degree, and allows the construction of a precision approach.

Although the encoding scheme is complex, and requires a considerable amount of ground equipment, the resulting signal is both far more accurate than the older beam-based systems and is far more resistant to common forms of interference. For instance, static in the signal will affect both sub-signals equally, so it will have no effect on the result. Similarly, changes in overall signal strength as the aircraft approaches the runway, or changes due to fading, will have little effect on the resulting measurement because they would normally affect both channels equally. The system is subject to multipath distortion effects due to the use of multiple frequencies, but because those effects are dependent on the terrain, they are generally fixed in location and can be accounted for through adjustments in the antenna or phase shifters.

Additionally, because it is the encoding of the signal within the beam that contains the angle information, not the strength of the beam, the signal does not have to be tightly focussed in space. In the older beam systems, the accuracy of the equisignal area was a function of the pattern of the two directional signals, which demanded that they be relatively narrow. The ILS pattern can be much wider. This allows for a wide variety of approach paths.

The glideslope works in the same general fashion as the localizer and uses the same encoding, but is normally transmitted to produce a centerline at an angle of 3 degrees above horizontal from an antenna beside the runway instead of the end. The only difference between the signals is that the localizer is transmitted using lower carrier frequencies, using 40 selected channels between 108.10 MHz and 111.95 MHz, whereas the glideslope has a corresponding set of 40 channels between 328.6 and 335.4 MHz. The higher frequencies generally result in the glideslope radiating antennas being smaller. The channel pairs are not linear; localizer channel 1 is at 108.10 and paired with glideslope at 334.70, whereas channel two is 108.15 and 334.55. There are gaps and jumps through both bands.

Many illustrations of the ILS concept often show the system operating more similarly to beam systems with the 90 Hz signal on one side and the 150 on the other. These illustrations are inaccurate; both signals are radiated across the entire beam pattern, it is their relative difference in the depth of modulation (DDM) that changes dependent upon the position of the approaching aircraft.

Using ILS
An instrument approach procedure chart (or 'approach plate') is published for each ILS approach to provide the information needed to fly an ILS approach during instrument flight rules (IFR) operations. A chart includes the radio frequencies used by the ILS components or navaids and the prescribed minimum visibility requirements.

An aircraft approaching a runway is guided by the ILS receivers in the aircraft by performing modulation depth comparisons. Many aircraft can route signals into the autopilot to fly the approach automatically. An ILS consists of two independent sub-systems. The localizer provides lateral guidance; the glide slope provides vertical guidance.

Localizer 

A localizer (LOC, or LLZ until ICAO standardisation) is an antenna array normally located beyond the departure end of the runway and generally consists of several pairs of directional antennas.

The localizer will allow the aircraft to turn and match the aircraft with the runway. After that, the pilots will activate approach phase (APP).

Glide slope (G/S)

The pilot controls the aircraft so that the glide slope indicator remains centered on the display to ensure the aircraft is following the glide path of approximately 3° above horizontal (ground level) to remain above obstructions and reach the runway at the proper touchdown point (i.e. it provides vertical guidance).

Limitations
Due to the complexity of ILS localizer and glide slope systems, there are some limitations. Localizer systems are sensitive to obstructions in the signal broadcast area, such as large buildings or hangars. Glide slope systems are also limited by the terrain in front of the glide slope antennas. If terrain is sloping or uneven, reflections can create an uneven glidepath, causing unwanted needle deflections. Additionally, since the ILS signals are pointed in one direction by the positioning of the arrays, glide slope supports only straight-line approaches with a constant angle of descent. Installation of an ILS can be costly because of siting criteria and the complexity of the antenna system.

ILS critical areas and ILS sensitive areas are established to avoid hazardous reflections that would affect the radiated signal. The location of these critical areas can prevent aircraft from using certain taxiways leading to delays in takeoffs, increased hold times, and increased separation between aircraft.

Variant
 Instrument guidance system (IGS) (localizer type directional aid (LDA) in the United States) – a modified ILS to accommodate a non-straight approach; the most famous example was for the approach to runway 13 at Kai Tak Airport, Hong Kong.
 Instrument carrier landing system (ICLS) – a modified ILS for carrier landing.

Identification

In addition to the previously mentioned navigational signals, the localizer provides for ILS facility identification by periodically transmitting a 1,020 Hz Morse code identification signal. For example, the ILS for runway 4R at John F. Kennedy International Airport transmits IJFK to identify itself, while runway 4L is known as IHIQ. This lets users know the facility is operating normally and that they are tuned to the correct ILS. The glide slope station transmits no identification signal, so ILS equipment relies on the localizer for identification.

Monitoring
It is essential that any failure of the ILS to provide safe guidance be detected immediately by the pilot. To achieve this, monitors continually assess the vital characteristics of the transmissions. If any significant deviation beyond strict limits is detected, either the ILS is automatically switched off or the navigation and identification components are removed from the carrier. Either of these actions will activate an indication ('failure flag') on the instruments of an aircraft using the ILS.

Localizer back course
Modern localizer antennas are highly directional. However, usage of older, less directional antennas allows a runway to have a non-precision approach called a localizer back course. This lets aircraft land using the signal transmitted from the back of the localizer array. Highly directional antennas do not provide a sufficient signal to support a back course. In the United States, back course approaches are typically associated with Category I systems at smaller airports that do not have an ILS on both ends of the primary runway. Pilots flying a back course should disregard any glide slope indication.

Marker beacons

On some installations, marker beacons operating at a carrier frequency of 75 MHz are provided. When the transmission from a marker beacon is received it activates an indicator on the pilot's instrument panel and the tone of the beacon is audible to the pilot. The distance from the runway at which this indication should be received is published in the documentation for that approach, together with the height at which the aircraft should be if correctly established on the ILS. This provides a check on the correct function of the glide slope. In modern ILS installations, a DME is installed, co-located with the ILS, to augment or replace marker beacons. A DME continuously displays the aircraft's distance to the runway.

DME substitution

Distance measuring equipment (DME) provides pilots with a slant range measurement of distance to the runway. DMEs are augmenting or replacing markers in many installations. The DME provides more accurate and continuous monitoring of correct progress on the ILS glide slope to the pilot, and does not require an installation outside the airport boundary. When used in conjunction with an ILS, the DME is often sited midway between the reciprocal runway thresholds with the internal delay modified so that one unit can provide distance information to either runway threshold. For approaches where a DME is specified in lieu of marker beacons, DME required is noted on the instrument approach procedure and the aircraft must have at least one operating DME unit, or an IFR-approved system using a GNSS (an RNAV system meeting TSO-C129/ -C145/-C146), to begin the approach.

Approach lighting

Some installations include medium- or high-intensity approach light systems (abbreviated ALS). Most often, these are at larger airports but many small general aviation airports in the U.S. have approach lights to support their ILS installations and obtain low-visibility minimums. The ALS assists the pilot in transitioning from instrument to visual flight, and to align the aircraft visually with the runway centerline. Pilot observation of the approach lighting system at the Decision Altitude allows the pilot to continue descending towards the runway, even if the runway or runway lights cannot be seen, since the ALS counts as runway end environment. In effect, ALS extends the runway environment out towards the landing aircraft and allows low-visibility operations. CAT II and III ILS approaches generally require complex high-intensity approach light systems, while medium-intensity systems are usually paired with CAT I ILS approaches. At some non-towered airports, the pilot controls the lighting system; for example, the pilot can key the microphone seven times to turn on the lights on the high intensity, five times to medium intensity or three times for low intensity.

Decision altitude and height
Once established on an approach, the pilot follows the ILS approach path indicated by the localizer and descends along the glide path to the decision height. This is the height at which the pilot must have adequate visual reference to the landing environment (e.g. approach or runway lighting) to decide whether to continue the descent to a landing; otherwise, the pilot must execute a missed approach procedure, then try the same approach again, try a different approach, or divert to another airport.

ILS categories

Smaller aircraft generally are equipped to fly only a CAT I ILS. On larger aircraft, these approaches typically are controlled by the flight control system with the flight crew providing supervision. CAT I relies only on altimeter indications for decision height, whereas CAT II and CAT III approaches use radio altimeter (RA) to determine decision height.

An ILS must shut down upon internal detection of a fault condition. Higher categories require shorter response times; therefore, ILS equipment is required to shut down more quickly. For example, a CAT I localizer must shut down within 10 seconds of detecting a fault, but a CAT III localizer must shut down in less than 2 seconds.

Special CAT II and CAT III operations

In contrast to other operations, CAT III weather minima do not provide sufficient visual references to allow a manual landing to be made. CAT IIIb minima depend on roll-out control and redundancy of the autopilot, because they give only enough time for the pilot to decide whether the aircraft will land in the touchdown zone (basically CAT IIIa) and to ensure safety during rollout (basically CAT IIIb). Therefore, an automatic landing system is mandatory to perform Category III operations. Its reliability must be sufficient to control the aircraft to touchdown in CAT IIIa operations and through rollout to a safe taxi speed in CAT IIIb (and CAT IIIc when authorized). However, special approval has been granted to some operators for hand-flown CAT III approaches using a head-up display (HUD) guidance that provides the pilot with an image viewed through the windshield with eyes focused at infinity, of necessary electronic guidance to land the airplane with no true outside visual references.

In the United States, airports with CAT III approaches have listings for CAT IIIa and IIIb or just CAT III on the instrument approach plate (U.S. Terminal Procedures). CAT IIIb RVR minimums are limited by the runway/taxiway lighting and support facilities, and are consistent with the airport surface movement guidance control system (SMGCS) plan. Operations below 600 ft RVR require taxiway centerline lights and taxiway red stop bar lights. FAA Order 8400.13D limits CAT III to 300 ft RVR or better. Order 8400.13D (2009) allows special authorization CAT II approaches to runways without ALSF-2 approach lights and/or touchdown zone/centerline lights, which has expanded the number of potential CAT II runways.

In each case, a suitably equipped aircraft and appropriately qualified crew are required. For example, CAT IIIb requires a fail-operational system, along with a crew who are qualified and current, while CAT I does not. A HUD that allows the pilot to perform aircraft maneuvers rather than an automatic system is considered as fail-operational. A HUD allows the flight crew to fly the aircraft using the guidance cues from the ILS sensors such that if a safe landing is in doubt, the crew can respond in an appropriate and timely manner. HUD is becoming increasingly popular with "feeder" airlines and most manufacturers of regional jets are now offering HUDs as either standard or optional equipment. A HUD can provide capability to take off in low visibility.

Some commercial aircraft are equipped with automatic landing systems that allow the aircraft to land without transitioning from instruments to visual conditions for a normal landing. Such autoland operations require specialized equipment, procedures and training, and involve the aircraft, airport, and the crew. Autoland is the only way some major airports such as Charles de Gaulle Airport remain operational every day of the year. Some modern aircraft are equipped with enhanced flight vision systems based on infrared sensors, that provide a day-like visual environment and allow operations in conditions and at airports that would otherwise not be suitable for a landing. Commercial aircraft also frequently use such equipment for takeoffs when takeoff minima are not met.

For both automatic and HUD landing systems, the equipment requires special approval for its design and also for each individual installation. The design takes into consideration additional safety requirements for operating an aircraft close to the ground and the ability of the flight crew to react to a system anomaly. The equipment also has additional maintenance requirements to ensure that it is capable of supporting reduced visibility operations.

Of course nearly all of this pilot training and qualification work is done in simulators with various degrees of fidelity.

Use
At a controlled airport, air traffic control will direct aircraft to the localizer course via assigned headings, making sure aircraft do not get too close to each other (maintain separation), but also avoiding delay as much as possible. Several aircraft can be on the ILS at the same time, several miles apart. An aircraft that has turned onto the inbound heading and is within two and a half degrees of the localizer course (half scale deflection or less shown by the course deviation indicator) is said to be established on the approach. Typically, an aircraft is established by at least  prior to the final approach fix (glideslope intercept at the specified altitude).

Aircraft deviation from the optimal path is indicated to the flight crew by means of a display dial (a carryover from when an analog meter movement indicated deviation from the course line via voltages sent from the ILS receiver).

The output from the ILS receiver goes to the display system (head-down display and head-up display if installed) and may go to a Flight Control Computer. An aircraft landing procedure can be either coupled where the autopilot or Flight Control Computer directly flies the aircraft and the flight crew monitor the operation, or uncoupled where the flight crew flies the aircraft manually to keep the localizer and glideslope indicators centered.

History

Tests of the ILS began in 1929 in the United States, with Jimmy Doolittle becoming the first pilot to take off, fly and land an airplane using instruments alone, without a view outside the cockpit. A basic system, fully operative, was introduced in 1932 at Berlin-Tempelhof Central Airport (Germany) named LFF or "Lorenz beam" due its inventor, the C. Lorenz AG company. The Civil Aeronautics Board (CAB) of the United States authorized installation of the system in 1941 at six locations. The first landing of a scheduled U.S. passenger airliner using ILS was on January 26, 1938, when a Pennsylvania Central Airlines Boeing 247D flew from Washington, D.C., to Pittsburgh, Pennsylvania, and landed in a snowstorm using only the Instrument Landing System. The first fully automatic landing using ILS occurred in March 1964 at Bedford Airport in the UK.

Market
The instrument landing systems market revenue was US$1,215 Million in 2019, and is expected to reach US$1,667 Million in 2025, with a CAGR of 5.41% during 2020-2025 even with the negative effects of the COVID-19 pandemic.

Suppliers
The top 10 manufacturers in the instrument landing systems market are:

Airport Lighting Specialists
Saab Sensis
Advanced Navigation and Positioning
ADB Airfield Solutions
Universal Avionics
Honeywell
Astronics
Liberty Airport Systems
Thales
Rockwell Collins

Other manufacturers include:
Indra (Normarc ILS)

Alternatives
 The Microwave Landing System (MLS) allowed for curved approaches. It was introduced in the 1970s to replace ILS but fell out of favor because of the introduction of satellite based systems. In the 1980s, there was a major US and European effort to establish MLS. But a combination of airline reluctance to invest and the rise of Global Navigation Satellite System (GNSS) resulted in its not being adopted in civil aviation.  At the time ILS and MLS were the only standardized systems in Civil Aviation that meet requirements for Category III automated landings. The first Category III MLS for civil aviation was commissioned at Heathrow airport in March 2009 and removed from service in 2017.
 Transponder Landing System (TLS) can be used where a conventional ILS cannot work or is not cost-effective.
 Localizer Performance with Vertical guidance (LPV) is based on the Wide Area Augmentation System (WAAS), LPV has similar minima to ILS for appropriately equipped aircraft. , the FAA has published more LPV approaches than Category I ILS procedures.
 Ground-Based Augmentation System (GBAS) (Local Area Augmentation System in the United States) is a safety-critical system that augments the GNSS Standard Positioning Service (SPS) and provides enhanced levels of service. It supports all phases of approach, landing, departure, and surface operations within the VHF coverage volume. GBAS is expected to play a key role in modernization and in all-weather operations capability at CATI/II and III airports, terminal area navigation, missed approach guidance and surface operations. GBAS provides the capability to service the entire airport with a single frequency (VHF transmission) whereas ILS requires a separate frequency for each runway end. GBAS CAT-I is seen as a necessary step towards the more stringent operations of CAT-II/III precision approach and landing. The technical risk of implementing GBAS delayed widespread acceptance of the technology. The FAA, along with industry, have fielded Provably Safe Prototype GBAS stations that mitigate the impact of satellite signal deformation, ionosphere differential error, ephemeris error, and multipath.

Future
The advent of the Global Positioning System (GPS) provides an alternative source of approach guidance for aircraft. In the US, the Wide Area Augmentation System (WAAS) has been available in many regions to provide precision guidance to Category I standards since 2007. The equivalent European Geostationary Navigation Overlay Service (EGNOS) was certified for use in safety of life applications in March 2011. As such, the number of Cat I ILS installations may be reduced, however there are no plans in the United States to phase out any Cat II or Cat III systems.

Local Area Augmentation System (LAAS) is under development to provide for Category III minimums or lower. The FAA Ground-Based Augmentation System (GBAS) office is currently working with the industry in anticipation of the certification of the first GBAS ground stations in Memphis, TN; Sydney, Australia; Bremen, Germany; Spain; and Newark, NJ. All four countries have installed GBAS ground stations and are involved in technical and operational evaluation activities.

The Honeywell and FAA team obtained System Design Approval of the world's first non-federal U.S. approval for LAAS Category I at Newark Liberty International Airport, operations in September 2009 and Operational Approval on September 28, 2012.

In Norway, a D-GPS based landing system, called SCAT-I, is in operation on some short runway airports.

See also 

 Acronyms and abbreviations in avionics
 Airspeed
 AN/CRN-2
 Autoland
 Blind approach beacon system (BABS)
 CFIT
 Distance measuring equipment (DME)
 EGPWS
 Flight director, FD
 Fog
 George Vernon Holloman – the pilot who made first automated landing
 Global Positioning System (GPS)
 HUD
 Instrument flight rules (IFR)
 Local Area Augmentation System (LAAS)
 Localizer performance with vertical guidance (LPV)
 Lorenz beam
 Microwave landing system (MLS)
 Non-directional beacon (NDB)
 Precision approach radar (PAR)
 Space modulation
 Transponder landing system (TLS)
 Visual flight rules (VFR)
 VHF omnidirectional range (VOR)
 Wide Area Augmentation System (WAAS)

Notes

References

 ICAO Annex 10 Volume 1, Radio Navigation Aids, Fifth Edition — July 1996
 Aeronautical Information Manual, FAA – February 11, 2010
 Digital Terminal Procedures, FAA – May 2010

External links 

 History of Aircraft Landing Aids – U.S. Centennial of Flight Commission
 "Happy Landings In Fog", June 1933, Popular Mechanics article on the early system setup in the USA.
 ILS Basics
 ILS Tutorial Animations
 Website dedicated to the description of ILS
 ILS Tutorial Animation  - Illustrates and describes how ILS navigation signals are displayed on board of an aircraft in various positions, which may occur during a safe approach for landing.
 Categories of the ILS
 

1929 in aviation
Navigational aids
Aircraft landing systems
Avionics
Radio navigation
Radio stations and systems ITU
Runway safety
Types of final approach (aviation)